Bailu Subdistrict is a subdistrict in Liubei District, Liuzhou, Guangxi, China. , it has 2 residential communities and 4 villages under its administration.

See also 
 List of township-level divisions of Guangxi

References 

Township-level divisions of Guangxi
Liuzhou
Subdistricts of the People's Republic of China